The men's scratch event of the 2003 UCI Track Cycling World Championships was held on 30 July 2003.

Results

References

External links
 Results at Tissottiming.com
 Race details at 'cyclingnews.com
 results at uci.ch

Men's scratch
UCI Track Cycling World Championships – Men's scratch